KTZR (1450 kHz) is a commercial AM radio station located in Tucson, Arizona. KTZR airs a sports format.  Its studios are located north of downtown Tucson along Oracle Road, while the transmitter site is southeast of downtown.

History
For many years, the station played an oldies format that played rock and roll hits of the 1950s and 1960s as "Cool 1450".

This station became "Funny 1450", as a comedy station, at 10AM on January 26, 2011; the last song on Cool was "Hello, Goodbye" by The Beatles.

On November 28, 2011, KWFM changed their format to Spanish adult hits, branded as "La Preciosa 1450" under new calls, KTZR.

On September 25, 2016, iHeartMedia announced that KTZR would flip to news/talk the following day. The new “Talk Of Tucson” duplicated some of the programming of sister station KNST in different timeslots. The Glenn Beck Radio Program added a live clearance on KTZR while continuing on KNST on a delay. Other shows that aired on KTZR included Trending Today with Rusty Humphries, The Savage Nation, Michael Berry, Rob Hunter, America Now with Meghan McCain, Ground Zero with Clyde Lewis, and Alex Jones. KTZR also became the flagship for the new Tucson Roadrunners of the American Hockey League, as well as the Tucson radio affiliate of the NFL’s Arizona Cardinals.

On July 24, 2017, KTZR changed formats from news/talk to sports, branded as "Fox Sports 1450".

References

External links
 Official Website

TZR
Radio stations established in 1947
1947 establishments in Arizona
IHeartMedia radio stations
Sports radio stations in the United States
Fox Sports Radio stations